Greater Valparaíso (Gran Valparaíso) is the second largest metropolitan area in Chile, after Greater Santiago. It takes this name after the city of Valparaíso, the oldest city of the group and the most important harbour in Chile. Its total population is 979,127 at the 2012 census, with an area of 401.6 square kilometers.

Major cities
The agglomeration is composed of several communes, and each is governed by its respective municipality:
Valparaíso
Viña del Mar
Concón
Quilpué
Villa Alemana

Communes
These communes have the following characteristics:

Valparaíso, Viña del Mar, Concón and Quintero are coastal cities. Villa Alemana and Quipué are located in inner valleys and belong to the group of cities known as El Interior (The Interior).
Valparaíso and Viña del Mar have traditionally concentrated industrial and commercial activities, while Quilpué and Villa Alemana are primarily residential, and therefore often considered ciudades dormitorio (sleeper cities).

Infrastructure

Education
Gran Valparaíso also has the third largest concentration of universities in Chile. Besides the Traditional Universities, it has several private institutions, including Universidad Adolfo Ibáñez, Universidad Andrés Bello, and Universidad del Mar.

Transportation
There is a rapid transit light rail system which serves most of the communes in the conurbation: The Valparaíso Metro.

Tourism
The area is a major tourist draw due to the internationally important Viña del Mar International Song Festival, its balnearios (beaches and resorts), and the world's largest pool San Alfonso del Mar in Algarrobo. The Historic Quarter of the Seaport City of Valparaíso is listed as a UNESCO World Heritage Site for its cultural significance.

References

Valparaiso
Populated places in Valparaíso Province
Coasts of Valparaíso Region